Protesilaus is a genus of butterflies in the family Papilionidae. They are native to the Americas.

Species
 Protesilaus aguiari (d'Almeida, 1937)
 Protesilaus earis (Rothschild & Jordan, 1906) - Rothschild's swordtail 
 Protesilaus glaucolaus (H. W. Bates, 1864) - Bates' swordtail 
 Protesilaus helios (Rothschild & Jordan, 1906)
 Protesilaus leucosilaus (J. Zikán, 1937)
 Protesilaus macrosilaus (Gray, [1853])
 Protesilaus molops (Rothschild& and Jordan, 1906)
 Protesilaus orthosilaus (Weymer, 1899)
 Protesilaus protesilaus (Linnaeus, 1758)
 Protesilaus stenodesmus (Rothschild & Jordan, 1906)
 Protesilaus telesilaus (C. Felder & R. Felder, 1864) - telesilaus kite

References

External links

 
BOA Images of types

Papilionidae
Papilionidae of South America
Butterfly genera
Taxa named by William John Swainson